Ephraim Williams (1715–1755) was an American soldier; benefactor of Williams College in Massachusetts.

Ephraim Williams may also refer to:

Ephraim Williams Sr. (1691 - 1754) was a colonial Massachusetts surveyor and land owner, instrumental in dispossession of the Mohicans.
Ephraim S. Williams (1802–1890), mayor of Flint, Michigan
Ephraim Williams (footballer) (1877–1954), Druids F.C. and Wales international footballer
Ephraim "Eph" Williams, African American variety show proprietor; see Silas Green from New Orleans
Ephraim Williams (mariner), 19th-century American sealer from Stonington, Connecticut, see Express Island
Ephraim Williams, see wreck of the Ephraim Williams, a ship sunk off North Carolina in 1884